Southeast 17th Avenue and Holgate Boulevard is a MAX Orange Line station located in the median of Southeast 17th Avenue at Holgate Boulevard in the Brooklyn neighborhood of Portland, Oregon.

Bus service
17 - Holgate/Broadway
70 - 12th/NE 33rd Ave

See also
 Passage (sculpture), installed along the MAX Orange Line
 Tri It, a nearby mural

References

2015 establishments in Oregon
Brooklyn, Portland, Oregon
MAX Light Rail stations
MAX Orange Line
Railway stations in Portland, Oregon
Railway stations in the United States opened in 2015